The Mexican National Tag Team Championship is a national Mexican professional wrestling championship controlled by the  (Mexico City Boxing and Wrestling Commission) and competed for by two-man tag teams. The championship was created in 1957, promoted regularly until 2003, and intermittently until 2011 when the last known defense took place.  (EMLL) had control of the championship from its creation until 1992, at which point it was transferred to AAA. The championship history up until 1982 is only partially known, with periods of times where it is unclear who held the championship, but it is generally accepted that the lineage began in 1957 when Los Hermanos Shadow (The Shadow Brothers; Blue Demon and Black Shadow) won an eight-team tournament to be crowned champions. The championship was reintroduced in 2020 after previously being abandoned in 2011.

In the mid-1990s there was confusion about who was recognized as champions for a period of time. In December 1995, one half of then-championship team Los Guerreras, Fuerza Guerrera, left AAA, which led to the promotion declaring the title vacant. On January 12, 1996, new champions were crowned as Juventud Guerrera and Psicosis defeated Volador and El Mexicano to claim the titles. When Juventud also left AAA, the  decided that Los Guerreras were never officially stripped of the championship, refusing to recognize Juventud Guerrera and Psicosis as champions. In August 1996, the commission finally declared the championship vacant and returned the championship belts to AAA for future use.

The last championship team under AAA's control was Octagón and La Parka, who won the championship on June 20, 2003, when they defeated Electroshock and Chessman. In early 2009, AAA stopped promoting all Mexican National Championships, opting to focus on their AAA branded championships. Octagón and La Parka were never stripped of the championship, but did not defend them on any AAA shows after late 2007. From that point on the championship was only defended twice on the Mexican independent circuit, in March 2009, and then in December 2011. The championship was inactive after the last known defense. until February 19, 2020 when  (CMLL; formerly EMLL) announced that they were bringing the championship back.

Esfinge & Fugaz are the current champions. They defeated Felino Jr. and Pólvora on March 20, 2022. There have been at least 43 championship reigns since 1957. Los Destructores (Tony Arce and Vulcano) held the championship three times, the most of all recognized champions, while Tony Arce holds the individual record with four reigns. Los Metálicos (Oro and Plata) had the shortest verified reign, six days in December 1991. Octagón and La Parka's reign lasted 3,110 days, the longest known reign of any champions. As with all professional wrestling championships, matches for the Mexican National Tag Team Championship were not won or lost competitively, but by a pre-planned ending to a match, with the outcome determined by the CMLL bookers and match makers. On occasion a promotion declared the championship vacant, which meant there was no champion at that point in time. This was either due to a storyline, or real life issues such as a champion suffering an injury being unable to defend the championship, or leaving the company. All title matches took place under two out of three falls rules.

Tournaments

1997
In 1997, the then-reigning champions Fuerza Guerrera and Juventud Guerrera began working for different promotions, causing the championship to be vacated by AAA. They held a one-night eight-team tournament on July 20, 1997, at the  El Toreo de Naucalpan bullfighting arena in Naucalpan, Mexico State. Some sources mistakenly list the AAA "Young Stars Tag Team" tournament held on May 15, 1997, and broadcast on June 7, as the championship tournament, which was won by the same team, but was not for the vacant championship.

2020

In 1992, then reigning Mexican National Tag Team Champions Los Destructores, left CMLL and doing so taking the championship with them to AAA. The championship was defended in AAA from 1992 until 2007, and subsequently only defended twice more on the independent circuit before becoming dormant. La Parka, one half of the last recognized championship team, died on January 11, 2020. A couple of weeks later CMLL officially announced that they had regained control of the Mexican National Tag Team Championship and would be holding a tournament for the championship in February and March. The tournament ran from February 28 to March 13, and saw Atlantis Jr. and Flyer defeated El Hijo de Villano III and Templario to win the championship.

Tournament brackets

Title history

Combined reigns

By team

By wrestler

Footnotes

References

External links
Mexican National Tag Team Championship

Lucha Libre AAA Worldwide championships
Consejo Mundial de Lucha Libre championships
Mexican national wrestling championships
Tag team wrestling championships
National professional wrestling championships